Maxwell T.  Friedman, better known by his ring name Maxwell Jacob Friedman (often abbreviated to MJF), is an American professional wrestler. He is currently signed to All Elite Wrestling (AEW), where he is the current AEW World Champion in his first reign, and holds the AEW Dynamite Diamond Ring, which he has won for four consecutive years.

He previously worked for Major League Wrestling (MLW), where he is a former MLW World Tag Team Champion, while also being a former one-time and inaugural MLW World Middleweight Champion. He departed MLW in January 2020. Friedman has also worked on the American independent circuit appearing most notably for Combat Zone Wrestling, where he is a former one-time CZW World Heavyweight Champion and a two-time CZW Wired Champion.

Early life
Maxwell T. Friedman was born into an American Jewish family in the suburbs of Plainview, New York, on Long Island. He graduated in 2014 from Plainview – Old Bethpage John F. Kennedy High School, where he was a member of the football team. During his senior year, he was named Honorable Mention, All County, for football. He briefly attended Hartwick College in Oneonta, New York.

In 2001, Friedman appeared on an episode of The Rosie O'Donnell Show, singing "You Are My Sunshine" after his parents submitted a tape of him singing it in an operatic style while eating a pear. After a video of his performance resurfaced in 2019, Friedman (while in character) initially denied the appearance before admitting it, stating that Rosie O'Donnell was trying to cling onto her fading star and that he "didn't have the nerve" to tell Britney Spears (who appeared on the same episode) that she "wasn't going to make it as a singer".

Professional wrestling career

Early career
Friedman was trained by Brian Myers and Pat Buck and made his in-ring debut in their Create A Pro Wrestling Academy in Hicksville, New York. He also wrestled for Combat Zone Wrestling and Five Borough Wrestling during his debut year and went on to appear in numerous promotions across the northeastern independent wrestling circuit. In April 2015, WWE uploaded Friedman's entry for WWE Tough Enough to their YouTube channel.

Combat Zone Wrestling (2015–2018)
Friedman worked under the new ring name Pete Lightning in several CZW Dojo Wars events since 2015, usually in tag team matches with Hous Blazer and Penelope Ford. On the September 7, 2016 edition of CZW Dojo Wars, he returned to his previous ring name Maxwell Jacob Feinstein, he entered the Dramatic Destination Series tournament. On May 13, 2017, at CZW Sacrifices, Friedman defeated Johnny Yuma to win the CZW Wired Championship. He won his first title defense at CZW EVILution, defeating Trevor Lee. He successfully retained the title in further singles matches against Mike Del, John Silver, and Ace Romero. On October 14 at CZW The Wolf of Wrestling, Friedman lost the CZW Wired title to Joey Janela. Two months later at CZW Cage of Death 19, Friedman won the title back after defeating Janela in a rematch.

Friedman returned on February 10, 2018, at CZW Nineteen, where he won the 27-Man Battle Royal to become the new number one contender for the CZW World Heavyweight Championship. He also successfully defended the CZW Wired Championship against Alex Colon on that date. He was the last Wired Champion before vacating the title on April 14 at CZW Best of the Best 17. There he defeated Rickey Shane Page to win the CZW World Heavyweight Championship for the first time.

Major League Wrestling (2017–2020)

World Middleweight Champion (2017–2018)

On September 5, 2017, it was reported that Friedman signed a contract with the reinstated Major League Wrestling (MLW) to appear at its reunion event One Shot to compete in a match against Jimmy Yuta, which Friedman won. Friedman then became a member of the MLW roster as he continued his winning streak against Joey Ryan at Never Say Never. MJF suffered his first loss in MLW against Brody King at Zero Hour on January 11, 2018. He then participated in a tournament for the vacant World Heavyweight Championship at Road To The World Championship, losing to the British wrestler Jimmy Havoc in the opening round. Friedman went on to defeat Lance Anoa'i at Spring Break. He made his Fusion debut on the May 11 episode by defeating Fred Yehi. He continued his success with an upset win over Montel Vontavious Porter at Intimidation Games.

On July 29, MJF defeated Joey Ryan to become the first-ever World Middleweight Champion at the Battle Riot special. Later that night, MJF participated in the namesake match as the #38 entrant and was eliminated by the eventual winner Tom Lawlor. On the August 10 episode of Fusion, MJF made his first title defense against Joey Janela in a falls count anywhere match, which he retained after Janela's on-screen girlfriend Aria Blake turned on Janela by hitting him in the head with a bottle. This led to Blake becoming MJF's valet. On the September 21 episode of Fusion, MJF and Blake defeated Joey Ryan and Taya Valkyrie in a mixed tag team match. MJF made his second title defense of the World Middleweight Championship on the November 9 episode of Fusion, where he successfully defended the title against Jason Cade and Jimmy Yuta in a three-way elimination match. On November 25, Friedman revealed that he had suffered a fractured elbow with a recovery time of 4–6 weeks. MLW later announced that the Middleweight title has been stripped from Friedman due not being cleared in time for his scheduled title defense at MLW's live Fusion December 14 episode.

The Dynasty (2019–2020)

 
MJF returned from his injury on the February 16, 2019 episode of Fusion, where he unsuccessfully challenged the new champion Teddy Hart for the World Middleweight Championship. After the match, Richard Holliday joined MJF in attacking Hart. As a result, the duo formed a team called The Dynasty and began feuding with the Hart Foundation. They were shortly after joined by the newcomer Alexander Hammerstone. He later won the MLW World Tag Team Championship with Richard Holliday as part of the Dynasty.

He left the promotion in January 2020.

All Elite Wrestling (2019–present)

Undefeated streak (2019–2020)

On January 7, 2019, it was announced that Friedman was signed to All Elite Wrestling (AEW) for a five-year deal. He debuted as a heel at Double or Nothing as a part of the pre-show Casino Battle Royale for an AEW World Championship opportunity. He lasted until the final two, before being eliminated by Adam Page. Friedman went on to compete in a four-way match against Page, Jimmy Havoc and Jungle Boy at Fyter Fest in June, which Page also won. The following month at Fight for the Fallen, he teamed with Shawn Spears and Sammy Guevara to defeat Havoc, Darby Allin, and Joey Janela in a six-man tag team match.

On the first episode of Dynamite on October 2, Friedman defeated Brandon Cutler by submission.  The following week on Dynamite, Friedman intervened in the attack of his "best friend" Cody by The Inner Circle, attacking Santana and Ortiz with a steel chair seemingly turning face. At Full Gear, he accompanied Cody in his AEW World Championship match against Chris Jericho. Cody lost the match after MJF threw in the towel when he was caught in the Liontamer and as a result, Cody was no longer allowed to challenge for the AEW World Championship again due to a pre-match stipulation. After the match, MJF turned heel on Cody by giving him a low blow and walked away. Shortly thereafter, MJF found a bodyguard in the debuting Wardlow. On the November 20 episode of Dynamite, MJF and Adam Page were the final two entrants in the inaugural Dynamite Dozen Battle Royale. The two met in a singles match on the following Dynamite, which MJF won. Diamond Dallas Page (DDP) then awarded him the Dynamite Diamond Ring as a prize for defeating Page. On January 15, 2020, at Bash at the Beach, MJF teamed with The Butcher and The Blade to defeat DDP, Dustin Rhodes and Q. T. Marshall. MJF rekindled his rivalry with Cody, and lay down three stipulations that Cody must follow to gain a match against him at Revolution which included not touching MJF till the match happened, facing Wardlow in a steel cage match and receiving ten lashes by MJF on live TV. On the February 5 episode of Dynamite, Cody took the ten lashes from MJF, including one from Wardlow. Cody then went on to beat Wardlow in the first steel cage match in AEW's history on the February 19 episode of Dynamite to make the match against MJF at Revolution official. At Revolution, MJF defeated Cody by pinfall after hitting him on the face with the Dynamite Diamond Ring. MJF then entered a feud with Jungle Boy, defeating him at Double or Nothing with a roll-up. On the May 27 episode of Dynamite, MJF unsuccessfully competed in a battle royal to face Cody for the AEW TNT Championship, being eliminated by Jungle Boy. At Fyter Fest, MJF and Wardlow were defeated by Jungle Boy and Luchasaurus. MJF then moved onto a feud with Jon Moxley, campaigning against Moxley's championship reign and decreed that fans deserved a better champion. The two faced at All Out on September 5, where MJF was defeated, marking his first loss in a singles match.

The Inner Circle (2020–2021)

On the October 28 episode of Dynamite, Chris Jericho and MJF agreed to wrestle each other at Full Gear during a confrontational "Town Hall Meeting" with Eric Bischoff. Should MJF win, he would join Jericho's Inner Circle. The previous week, Jericho and MJF had participated in "Le Dinner Debonair", a meeting over a steak dinner during which Jericho and MJF performed a modified rendition of "Me and My Shadow". Journalist Wesley Morris later named the performance one of the "Best Performances of 2020" in an article published by The New York Times. At Full Gear, MJF, along with Wardlow, became members of Inner Circle after he pinned Jericho. On November 11 episode of Dynamite, MJF appeared for the first time as a member of The Inner Circle, where he gave a speech talking the struggles he overcame to get this far in wrestling, and then brought out a surprise birthday party for Jericho, the group's leader, which involved free tickets to Las Vegas and leading the crowd in a rousing rendition of "Happy Birthday". On December 2, at Winter Is Coming, MJF once again became a contender for a Dynamite Diamond Ring after he and Orange Cassidy were the final two entrants in the second Dynamite Dozen Battle Royale. On the December 9 episode of Dynamite, MJF won his second Diamond Ring after pinning Cassidy.

On the January 20, 2021 episode of Dynamite, a tag team battle royal was announced for Beach Break, with the winners getting an AEW World Tag Team Championship match against The Young Bucks (Matt Jackson and Nick Jackson) at Revolution. The Young Bucks also participated and had they won, they could have chosen their opponents. Jericho last eliminated Dante Martin of Top Flight to win the battle royal, earning himself and MJF a title match at Revolution. On the February 10 episode of Dynamite, following weeks of growing tension between MJF and Guevara, Guevara attacked MJF following a backstage confrontation, which gave MJF a kayfabe rib injury. Later on in the episode, following MJF and Jericho's victory against The Acclaimed (Anthony Bowens and Max Caster) in a tag team match, Guevara announced his departure from The Inner Circle. In the lead-up to their match at Revolution, MJF and Jericho attacked The Young Bucks' father, Papa Buck, and bloodied him backstage, vowing to take the titles off them. At Revolution, however, MJF and Jericho were defeated by The Young Bucks.

The Pinnacle (2021–2022)

On the March 10, 2021 episode of Dynamite, MJF was kicked out from The Inner Circle after it was revealed that he was secretly planning to perform a coup of the group. However, he then revealed that he had been building his own group with Wardlow, Shawn Spears, Tully Blanchard and FTR (Cash Wheeler and Dax Harwood), who appeared and violently attacked The Inner Circle. The stable would come to be known as The Pinnacle. At Blood and Guts on May 5, The Pinnacle defeated The Inner Circle in the inaugural Blood and Guts match. At Double or Nothing on May 30, The Pinnacle lost to The Inner Circle in a Stadium Stampede match. At All Out on September 5, MJF faced once again Jericho, with Jericho's career on the line. After a false victory for MJF, in which referee Aubrey Edwards counted the pin for MJF but did not see Jericho's foot placed on the rope, the match was restarted and Jericho forced MJF to submit to the "Walls of Jericho", losing for the first time against Jericho.

On the November 17 episode of Dynamite, MJF began a feud with CM Punk, after Punk interrupted his promo. On the February 2, 2022 episode of Dynamite, MJF became the first person to defeat Punk in AEW and also the person to defeat him in a televised match since 2014. During the match, which was held in Punk's hometown of Chicago, Illinois, MJF scored a pinfall over Punk after Wardlow provided a ringside distraction and handed MJF his Dynamite Diamond Ring, which he then hit Punk with. On March 6 at Revolution, Wardlow, who began developing tension with MJF in December 2021, turned on MJF and helped Punk defeat him in a Dog Collar match by handing Punk the Dynamite Diamond Ring, which Punk then struck MJF with. On the May 18 episode of Dynamite, Wardlow, as part of a set of contract stipulations which would make him able to wrestle MJF, was lashed 10 times by MJF. The following week on Dynamite, Wardlow completed the final stipulation which guaranteed him a match with MJF at the upcoming Double or Nothing by defeating Shawn Spears in steel cage match, with MJF serving as the special referee and being unsuccessful in his effort to cost Wardlow the match after Spears accidentally knocked him out; should Wardlow win, he would be officially released from his contract with MJF, but would be banned from obtaining a new AEW contract and be required to remain under MJF's employment should he lose. At Double or Nothing, MJF lost to Wardlow after ten powerbombs, MJF's first clean loss in singles action in AEW.

During the Double or Nothing weekend of May, MJF legitimately no-showed a fan fest. This came after months of rumors about the backstage tension between MJF and AEW owner Tony Khan about MJF's contract and payment he felt he should have, as well as doing an interview with Ariel Helwani without telling management. On the June 1 episode of Dynamite, MJF cut a worked shoot promo about not being respected by the fans and Khan. The segment ended with MJF demanding to be fired by Khan, calling Khan a "fucking mark", his microphone being cut off, quickly fading to commercial, and the commentators not referencing the situation after the break. The next day, his profile was removed from AEW’s website and his merchandise was pulled on AEW’s merchandise site as part of the storyline.

AEW World Champion (2022–present)
MJF made his return to AEW programming at All Out on September 4 under a mask, winning the Casino Ladder match as the joker entrant and securing himself a future shot for the AEW World Championship with the help of Stokely Hathaway. He was officially revealed to be the person behind the mask at the end of the event, when he came out and stared down the newly crowned AEW World Champion CM Punk on the entrance stage.

On the September 14 episode of Dynamite, MJF introduced his faction, The Firm, led by Stokely Hathaway. This new faction was considered as MJF's "Support System" and when they were not supporting MJF, all of the members in The Firm would do their own thing. However, on the October 26 episode, MJF was attacked by The Firm, after he had fired Hathaway for disobeying his orders not to attack AEW World Champion Jon Moxley because he wanted Moxley at 100% for their title match at Full Gear. On November 19 at Full Gear, MJF defeated Moxley after using William Regal's signature brass knuckles. Regal slid them into the ring for MJF, helping to make him the youngest AEW World Champion in the history of the company. On the November 30 episode of Dynamite, MJF discarded the standard AEW World Championship belt, calling it trash, and unveiled his own custom version, which he dubbed Triple-B, the "Big Burberry Belt". It features the exact same design as the standard belt; however, the leather strap is brown and fashioned in Burberry's trademark check pattern to match MJF's signature Burberry scarf. Later in the segment, MJF turned on Regal by attacking him, causing him to be taken to a nearby hospital thus ending their partnership. At Revolution on March 5 2023, MJF defeated Bryan Danielson in the overtime of their sixty-minute Iron Man match, which had ended in a tie.

Professional wrestling style, persona, and reception
Friedman's character has been described by The New York Times as "part heel, part tool ... and part goodfella wannabe". Many people within the wrestling industry have praised MJF for his aggressive heel persona, largely due to his ability to blur the line of kayfabe, often insulting fans and other non-professional wrestling celebrities on social media; Dasher Hatfield praised MJF's character, since he can "walk on the edge, being heel without people calling him racist or homophobic". He has also been praised for his professionalism and skill, despite his young age, by the likes of Jim Ross, Jim Cornette, and Chris Jericho.

Personal life 
Since mid-2020, he had been dating artist Naomi Rosenblum. On September 15, 2022, they announced their engagement on social media. However, in February 2023, it was revealed that they had split.

Filmography

Film

Television

Championships and accomplishments
AAW Wrestling
AAW Heritage Championship (1 time)
All Elite Wrestling
AEW World Championship (1 time, current)
Dynamite Diamond Ring (2019, 2020, 2021, 2022)
Casino Ladder Match (2022)
Dynamite Award (1 time)
Best Mic Duel (2022) - 
Alpha-1 Wrestling
A1 Outer Limits Championship (1 time)
CBS Sports
Rookie of the Year (2019)
Combat Zone Wrestling
CZW Wired Championship (1 time)
CZW World Heavyweight Championship (1 time)
Dramatic Dream Team
Ironman Heavymetalweight Championship (1 time)
ESPN
Promo artist of the year (2022)
Inspire Pro Wrestling
Inspire Pro Wrestling Pure Prestige Championship (1 time)
LDN Wrestling
LDN Capital Wrestling Championship (2 times)
Limitless Wrestling

Limitless Wrestling World Championship (1 time)
Major League Wrestling
MLW World Middleweight Championship (1 time)
MLW World Tag Team Championship (1 time) – with Richard Holliday
Maryland Championship Wrestling
MCW Rage Television Championship (1 time)
New York Post
 Promo of the Year (2022) — 
Pro Wrestling Illustrated
 Ranked No. 22 of the top 500 singles wrestlers in the PWI 500 in 2020
 Feud of the Year (2021) 
 Feud of the Year (2022) 
 Most Hated Wrestler of the Year (2021, 2022)
 Faction of the Year (2021) – with The Inner Circle
Rockstar Pro Wrestling
American Luchacore Championship (1 time)
Rockstar Pro Trios Championship (1 time) – with Ace Romero and Clayton Jackson
Wrestling Observer Newsletter
 Best on Interviews (2021, 2022)
 Most Charismatic (2020, 2022)
WrestlePro
WrestlePro Tag Team Championship (1 time) - with Valerio Lamorte
Xcite Wrestling
Xcite International Championship (1 time)
Other awards
Best Performance (2020) – for his rendition of "Me and My Shadow" with Chris Jericho (awarded by Wesley Morris of The New York Times)

See also
 List of Jewish professional wrestlers

References

External links 

 
 Major League Wrestling profile
 

1996 births
AEW World Champions
All Elite Wrestling personnel
American male professional wrestlers
Jewish American sportspeople
Jewish professional wrestlers
Living people
Professional wrestlers from New York (state)
Sportspeople from Nassau County, New York
21st-century American Jews
People from Plainview, New York
Wrestling Observer Newsletter award winners
21st-century professional wrestlers
CZW World Heavyweight Champions
CZW Wired Champions
MLW World Tag Team Champions
Ironman Heavymetalweight Champions
AAW Heritage Champions
MLW World Middleweight Champions